Noble Consort Chengmu (1343–1374) of the Sun clan, was an imperial consort of the Ming dynasty. She was a concubine of Emperor Hongwu (Zhu Yuanzhang), the first ruler of the Ming dynasty.

Life 
Her personal name was not recorded in the history.

Lady Sun's father, Sun Heqing, was an official of the Yuan dynasty.Sun Heqing moved from Chen Prefecture to Changzhou together with his wife and children. Lady Sun had two older brothers: Sun Dashi (孙大石) and Sun Fan (孫藩).Both of her parent died in the war of the Yuan dynasty.She was adopted by Marshal Ma Shixiong (馬世熊)

At the age of 18, because of her outstanding beauty, Sun was accepted as a concubine by Zhu Yuanzhang, who was still fighting in the Red Turban Rebellions. After Zhu Yuanzhang ascended the throne and established the Ming dynasty, Lady Sun was given the rank of Noble Consort (贵妃).

Im addition to her beauty, Concubine Sun was good at etiquette, behaved well, and assisted Empress Ma in managing the harem.Empress Ma also praised Noble Consort Sun to Zhu Yuanzhang as a rare virtuous woman.

Noble Consort Sun died in September of the seventh year of Hongwu ( 1374 ) and was given the posthumous title of Noble Consort Chengmu (成穆貴妃) at the age of thirty-two.Later, she was buried in Xiaoling Mausoleum.

References

《明史 卷一百十四 列传第一》

Cheng, Consort
Cheng, Consort
Cheng, Consort
People from Zhoukou